Naalo Unna Prema is a 2001 Telugu-language romantic drama film, produced by K.L.N. Raju on Sri Sairam Productions banner and directed by V. R. Pratap. The film stars Jagapati Babu, Laya, Gajala  and music was composed by Koti. This film is the debut of Gajala in Telugu and she is titled as Raaji by her character name in the film. Later her screen name was changed to Gajala from the film Student No.1 by K. Raghavendra Rao. The film was a remake of Kannada film Chandramukhi Pranasakhi 1999.

Plot 
The film begins in Hyderabad where a businessman Sai Krishna a stan of popular singer Hema from Vizag. Once, he visits his friend’s wedding and encounters an impish girl Raaji who has know no bounds for her devilishness. She pokes fun at Sai Krishna and he smartly paybacks. So, ired Raaji seeks vengeance. Meanwhile, Hema’s musical night is conducted on eve of nuptial when Sai Krishna is on cloud nine and falls for her. Moreover, he learns Hema & Raaji as siblings. Soon after the return, Sai Krishna writes a letter to Hema to tie. Fortuitously, it is picked up by Raaji, at this time, she starts her horseplay. Now she poses as Hema by writing letters and making telephonic conversations. After some time, Raaji travels to Hyderabad officially. Therein, Sai Krishna cares for her meticulously in favour of Hema. Perceiving it, Raaji inadvertently starts loving him.

After homecoming Raaji makes various attempts to reveal reality but she is hesitant. Simultaneously, Sai Krishna’s dearness to Hema escalates. He bestows a locket containing his & Hema's photos which Raaji starts wearing and feels for herself. Concurrently, Sai Krishna organises Hema’s program in his town. At the concert, Hema aspires to wear the locket as unbeknownst, and Raaji unwilling hands over. But Raaji is distraught that what would happen when Sai Krishna & Hema come across each other. Hence, she divulges the fact to Sai Krishna through a letter. However, before it arrives, he moves on. Immediately after the concert, Sai Krishna tries to speak to Hema. Anyhow, she opines him mischief-maker and mortifies him. Thus, enraged Sai Krishna slaps Hema and shows the locket as evidence of their love.

At the sight of it, Hema turbulently reaches home and assaults Raaji. Besides, Sai Krishna is inflamed and distressed. During that predicament, the elders think it worthy to have a word facing each other and they decide to knit Sai Krishna & Hema. Sai Krishna accepts it provided Raaji should apologise to him. So, he proceeds to their house where he lonely conversates with Hema & Raaji. Herein, he proclaims that he does not have the heart to espouse Hema because it is Raaji who reciprocated his feeling. Plus, he is cognizant of Raaji’s true love with her last forgiveness letter. At last, Sai Krishna heartfully proposes to Raaji which she blissfully agrees. Finally, the movie ends on a happy note with the marriage of Sai Krishna & Raaji.

Cast 
 Jagapati Babu as Sai Krishna
 Laya as Hema
 Gajala as Raji
 Ranganath as Sai's father
 Giri Babu as Hema's father
 M. S. Narayana as Tabelu Vamana Rao
 L. B. Sriram as Bose
 Annapurna as Sai's mother
 Kovai Sarala as Sarala
 Indu Anand
 Ram Jagan
 Ananth
 Visweswara Rao

Soundtrack 
Music composed by Koti.

References

External links 
 

2000s Telugu-language films
2001 films
2001 romantic drama films
Films scored by Koti
Films set in Hyderabad, India
Films shot in Hyderabad, India
Films shot in Visakhapatnam
Indian romantic drama films
Telugu remakes of Kannada films